The Metallica Collection is a digital box set by the American heavy metal band Metallica. It was released to the iTunes Store on April 14, 2009. The box set features all of the band's studio albums and extra material from 1983 to 2008. The box set was later released to other digital music stores such Amazon MP3 and UOL Megastore.

Box set items
The following items are included in the set (bonus live tracks are listed for each album)

 Kill 'Em All (1983)
 "The Four Horsemen (Live)"
 "Whiplash (Live)"
 Ride the Lightning (1984)
 "For Whom the Bell Tolls (Live)"
 "Creeping Death (Live)"
 Master of Puppets (1986)
 "Battery (Live)"
 "The Thing That Should Not Be (Live)"
 ...And Justice for All (1988)
 "One (Live)"
 "...And Justice for All (Live)"
 Metallica (1991)
 Load (1996)
 ReLoad (1997)
 Garage Inc. (1998)
 S&M (1999)
 "I Disappear" (2000)
 St. Anger (2003)
 Some Kind of Monster (2004)
 Live from Live Earth (iTunes exclusive EP) (2007)
 Death Magnetic (2008)

Live from Live Earth track listing
A recording from the Live Earth charity concert. Metallica played these 3 songs July 7, 2007 in London, England.

"Sad but True"
"Nothing Else Matters"
"Enter Sandman"

Personnel

Metallica
 James Hetfield – rhythm guitar, vocals; guitar solo ("Master of Puppets", "Orion", "Nothing Else Matters", "Whiskey in the Jar", "Stone Dead Forever", "Suicide & Redemption"), electro-acoustic guitar (S&M - "Nothing Else Matters")
 Lars Ulrich – drums
 Kirk Hammett – lead guitar; rhythm guitar (S&M - "Nothing Else Matters"), slide guitar (Garage, Inc. - "Turn The Page")
 Cliff Burton – bass guitar (Kill 'Em All - Master of Puppets; Garage, Inc. - "Am I Evil?", and "Blitzkrieg")
 Jason Newsted – bass guitar, backing vocals (...And Justice for All - 'I Disappear')
 Bob Rock – bass guitar (St. Anger & Some Kind of Monster)
 Robert Trujillo – bass guitar (Some Kind of Monster [Live Tracks] - Death Magnetic)

Additional musicians
 Michael Kamen - orchestration ("Nothing Else Matters" ; "S&M")

References

External links
 Official Metallica Website

Metallica compilation albums
2009 compilation albums
ITunes-exclusive releases
Albums produced by Flemming Rasmussen
Albums produced by Jon Zazula
Albums produced by Bob Rock
Albums produced by Rick Rubin